Maia  is the eldest of the Pleiades in Greek mythology, also identified with an Ancient Italic goddess of spring. Maia may also refer to:

Places

New Zealand
 Maia, New Zealand, a suburb of the city of Dunedin, New Zealand

Portugal
 Maia, Portugal, municipality
 Cidade da Maia, a city in the municipality above
 Maia (Ribeira Grande), a parish in Ribeira Grande Municipality in the Azores, Portugal

Romania
 Maia, Ialomița, a commune in Ialomiţa County
 Maia, a village in Bobâlna Commune, Cluj County
 Maia, a village in Bereni Commune, Mureș County

United Kingdom
 Maia, a Roman fort located in Bowness-on-Solway, England

United States
 Fitiuta, American Samoa, also known as Maia

People 
 Maia (given name), a feminine given name
 Maia (surname), a Portuguese surname
 Maia (singer), stage name of Colombian singer Mónica Andrea Vives Orozco
 Maia (nurse), wet-nurse of ancient Egyptian king Tutankhamun
 mxmtoon (a.k.a. Maia), a singer-songwriter and social media personality

Literature, fiction and entertainment 
 Maia (novel), a fantasy novel by Richard Adams
 Os Maias or "The Maias", a realist novel by Eça de Queirós, named after the protagonist family
 Maia (Middle-earth), one of a race of beings in J. R. R. Tolkien's Middle-earth writings
 Maia Skouris (née Rutledge), a character on the USA Network science fiction TV show The 4400
 Maia Jeffries, a character on the New Zealand soap opera Shortland Street
 Maïa, a 1910 opera by Ruggero Leoncavallo
 Maia Sterling, a character from the Robotech anime series
 Maia, the name given to Thumbelina by her newlywed husband, the King of the Spirit of the Flowers, in Hans Christian Andersen's original fairy tale "Thumbelina"
 Maia, Queen of Hallasar and reincarnation of the goddess Laharah in the video game Summoner 2
 Maia Mizuki, the protagonist of the anime Daphne in the Brilliant Blue
 Maia or Marina Le Cille (JP ver.), is a character in the game Phantasy Star III: Generations of Doom for Genesis/Mega Drive
 Maia, a werewolf character in The Mortal Instruments by Cassandra Clare
 Maia, a fictional asteroid in The Last Policeman and its sequels by Ben H. Winters
 Maia (video game) a science fiction video game

Other uses 
 Maia people, an indigenous tribe of Western Australia
 Maia (star), the fourth-brightest star in the Pleiades open-star cluster
 F.C. Maia, a Portuguese football club
 Short S.21 Maia, a piggyback long-range flying boat combination
 "-maia" or "maia-", an affix derived from the mythological Maia, used to describe maternal roles in taxonomy
 Multi-Angle Imager for Aerosols, a future NASA earth-orbiting instrument operated by the Jet Propulsion Laboratory
 Maia, a reusable launch vehicle by MaiaSpace, subsidiary of ArianeGroup

See also 
 Maïa (disambiguation)
 MAIA (disambiguation)
 Majo, or Maja, terms for people from the lower classes of Spanish society
 Maja (disambiguation)
 Mya (disambiguation)
 Maya (disambiguation)
 
 
 Maiasaura, a dinosaur named after the mythological goddess